The 1989 NCAA Division III football season, part of the college football season organized by the NCAA at the Division III level in the United States, began in August 1989, and concluded with the NCAA Division III Football Championship, also known as the Stagg Bowl, in December 1989 at Garrett-Harrison Stadium in Phenix City, Alabama. The Dayton Flyers won their second Division III championship by defeating the Union (NY) Dutchmen, 17−7.

Conference changes and new programs

Conference standings

Conference champions

Postseason
The 1989 NCAA Division III Football Championship playoffs were the 17th annual single-elimination tournament to determine the national champion of men's NCAA Division III college football. The championship Stagg Bowl game was held at Garrett-Harrison Stadium in Phenix City, Alabama for the 15th, and final, time and for the fifth consecutive year. Like the previous four tournaments, this year's bracket featured sixteen teams.

Playoff bracket

See also
1989 NCAA Division I-A football season
1989 NCAA Division I-AA football season
1989 NCAA Division II football season

References